Drenovac Radučki is an uninhabited settlement in the Gospić municipality in the Lika region of central Croatia.

Demographics

References

Ghost towns in Croatia
Serb communities in Croatia